Lucy is a 2006 German drama film directed by Henner Winckler.

Plot 
Maggy lives in Berlin. She is 18 years old, lives with her mother Eva and has an 8 month old daughter called Lucy. Maggy has a hard time dealing with the responsibility as a mother as she is still very young herself. She didn't finish school and doesn't want to anything to do with the father. If her mother Eva would not support her, her life would be even bleaker than it already is. Maggy still manages to go to a disco with her girlfriend from time to time. During one of these nights she meets Gordon and falls in love with the young man. Gordon stands on his own two feet, works and has his own apartment, although he isn't much older than Maggy.

Cast 
  - Maggy
  - Gordon
 Feo Aladag - Eva
 Polly Hauschild - Lucy
 Ninjo Borth - Mike
  - Nadine
 Jakob Bieber - Daniel
  - Steffi
  - Gordons first girlfriend

References

External links 

Official Website

2006 drama films
2006 films
German drama films
2000s German films